Frontier Wolf is a 1952 Italian adventure film written and directed by Edoardo Anton and starring Piero Lulli, Maria Frau and Tamara Lees.

It was shot at the Palatino Studios in Rome. The film's sets were designed by the art director Piero Filippone.

Synopsis
Following a series of attacks on a railway near the border, the police send in an undercover agent to discover who is behind the campaign.

Distribution 
It was first released on television on March 25, 2021 on Rete 4 at 2:50 am.

Cast
 Piero Lulli as Guido
 Maria Frau as Gilda
 Tamara Lees as Barbara
 Tonio Selwart as Peter
 Fausto Guerzoni as Falconiere
 Amedeo Trilli as Don Luigi
 Adalberto Roni as Enrico
 Edoardo Anton as Lorenzo
Armando Annuale as Sacerdote

References

External links
 
 Frontier Wolf at Variety Distribution

1952 films
1950s Italian-language films
Italian drama films
1952 drama films
Italian black-and-white films
Films directed by Edoardo Anton
Films shot at Palatino Studios
1950s Italian films